Banning-Lewis Ranches was a successful cattle-ranching operation located east of Colorado Springs, managed by Raymond W. Lewis and Ruth Banning Lewis.  The Lewises eventually acquired more than 30,000 acres on which Colorado Domino Type Herefords were raised.  They won the Colorado Soil Conservation program award in 1948. 

The city limits of Colorado Springs were extended to encompass Banning Lewis Ranch in 1988.  Efforts to develop the ranch into a residential community that could house up to 175,000 residents, and/or perform oil and gas exploration, have had limited success.  300 homes have been built on the northwest corner of the property, but the owners filed for bankruptcy in 2010. This lack of development has been used as an argument against spending at least $2.1 billion to build the "Southern Delivery System" water pipeline. As of 2015 the housing market in Colorado Springs exploded and now many new houses, mostly in the $300-$500,000 price range have been built with more under construction each day. In 2017, the housing market shows no signs of slowing down. Banning Lewis Ranch now has two schools, Banning Lewis Ranch Academy and Banning Lewis Prepratory Academy, with Banning Lewis Preparatory Academy opened in 2017, an activity center, two pools and a water park, walking trails and parks. It is one of the fastest-growing communities in Colorado Springs.

References 

Ranches in Colorado
Geography of Colorado Springs, Colorado
History of Colorado Springs, Colorado